Steinbach is a municipality in the Eichsfeld in Thuringia, Germany.

References

Eichsfeld (district)